
Jayu Qutta (Aymara jayu salt, quta lake, "salt lake", Hispanicized spelling Jayu Kkota) is a lake in the Oruro Department in Bolivia. It is situated west of Poopó Lake on the border of the sud Carangas Province (Santiago de Andamarca Municipality) and  the Carangas Province (Corque Municipality). Ubicado en RosaPata Jayu Quta is about 3.4 km long and 2.5 km at its widest point.

See also 
 Kimsa Chata
 Parina Quta

References 

Lakes of Oruro Department